He's My Man! (Spanish:¡Es mi hombre!) is a 1966 Spanish comedy film directed by Rafael Gil and starring José Luis López Vázquez, Soledad Miranda and Mercedes Vecino.

Cast
 José Luis López Vázquez as Antonio Jiménez  
 Soledad Miranda as Leonor Jiménez  
 Mercedes Vecino as Sole  
 Rafael Alonso as Mariano  
 Sancho Gracia as Jefe banda Sing-Sing  
 José Marco Davó as D. Felipe  
 Rafaela Aparicio as Señora Calixta  
 Ángel de Andrés as Portero Club Pinky  
 Alfonso del Real as Don Paco Maluenda  
 Julia Caba Alba as Sra. de D. Felipe  
 Roberto Camardiel as Don Tarsio 
 Fred Galiana as Bestia  
 Los Shakers as Conjunto musical

References

Bibliography 
 Bentley, Bernard. A Companion to Spanish Cinema. Boydell & Brewer 2008.

External links 
 

1966 comedy films
Spanish comedy films
1966 films
1960s Spanish-language films
Films based on works by Carlos Arniches
Films directed by Rafael Gil
1960s Spanish films
Spanish black-and-white films
Spanish films based on plays